Rainbow is the first album by Sayaka Yamamoto, a member of Japanese idol girl group NMB48. She made her solo debut with this album. It was released on 26 October 2016 under the label laugh out loud records. There are two editions. The limited edition includes a DVD with music video and the regular edition has only audio CD.

A musician Shikao Suga and Takuro, a guitarist of the rock band Glay provided a song but most of the songs and lyrics were written by herself. The sound producer is Seiji Kameda. He is best known as the former member of Tokyo Jihen.

It was number three on the weekly Oricon Albums Chart with 50,375 copies sold. It was number two on the Billboard Japan Album Sales Chart.

Track listing

Charts

References

Further reading

External links 
 Discography on Yoshimoto R and C Co.,Ltd.
 

2016 debut albums
Sayaka Yamamoto albums
Japanese-language albums